Parliamentary elections were held in Mali on 14 July 2002, with a second round in some constituencies on 28 July.

Results

References

Elections in Mali
Mali
2002 in Mali
July 2002 events in Africa
Election and referendum articles with incomplete results